Ceilândia Centro is a Federal District Metro brazilian station on Green line. It was opened on 16 April 2008, as part of the section between Ceilândia Sul and Terminal Ceilândia. The station is located between Guariroba and Ceilândia Norte.

References

Brasília Metro stations
2008 establishments in Brazil
Railway stations opened in 2008